Petrivka may refer to several places in Ukraine:

Petrivka, Kyiv, the historical neighborhood in Ukrainian capital Kyiv, as well as some notable objects located there, including:
Petrivka Railway Station, railway station
Petrivka, Khmelnytskyi Oblast, a village in Khmelnytskyi Raion of Khmelnytskyi Oblast
Petrivka, Donetsk Oblast, an urban-type settlement in Donetsk Oblast
Petrivka, Volnovakha Raion, a village in Donetsk Oblast
Petrivka, Luhansk Oblast, an urban-type settlement in Luhansk Oblast
Petrivka, Odessa Oblast, an urban-type settlement in Odessa Oblast
 , a village in Poltava Oblast
Petrivka, name of several other villages in Ukraine

See also
Petrovka (disambiguation)